Giant axonal neuropathy is a rare, autosomal recessive neurological disorder that causes disorganization of neurofilaments. Neurofilaments form a structural framework that helps to define the shape and size of neurons and are essential for normal nerve function. A distinguishing feature is its association with kinky, or curly, hair; in such cases it has been called Giant axonal neuropathy with curly hair.

Genetics

Giant axonal neuropathy results from mutations in the GAN gene, which codes for the protein gigaxonin. This alters the shape of the protein, changing how it interacts with other proteins when organizing the structure of the neuron.

Neurons affected by the altered protein accumulate excess neurofilaments in the axon, the long extension from the nerve cell that transmits its signal to other nerve cells and to muscles. These enlarged or 'giant' axons cannot transmit signals properly, and eventually deteriorate, resulting in the range of neurological anomalies associated with the disorder.

This disease is an autosomal recessive disorder, which means the defective gene is located on an autosome, and both parents must have one copy of the defective gene in order to have a child born with the disorder. The parents of a child with an autosomal recessive disorder are carriers, but are usually not affected by the disorder.

Diagnosis
Giant axonal neuropathy usually appears in infancy or early childhood, and is progressive. Early signs of the disorder often present in the peripheral nervous system, causing individuals with this disorder to have problems walking. Later, normal sensation, coordination, strength, and reflexes become affected. Hearing or vision problems may also occur. Abnormally kinky hair is characteristic of giant axonal neuropathy, appearing in almost all cases. As the disorder progresses, central nervous system becomes involved, which may cause a gradual decline in mental function, loss of control of body movement, and seizures.

Treatment

See also
 Polyneuropathy in dogs and cats

References

 This article may incorporate some public domain text from The U.S. National Library of Medicine

External links 
 
 GeneReview/NIH/UW entry on Giant Axonal Neuropathy

Autosomal recessive disorders
Rare diseases
Neurological disorders
Cytoskeletal defects